Boulevard Park is a census-designated place (CDP) in King County, Washington, United States. The population was 5,287 at the 2010 census. Boulevard Park was part of the Riverton-Boulevard Park CDP in 2000 but was split for the 2010 census into its own CDP.

Geography 
Boulevard Park is located at  (47.512172, -122.313151). It is bordered to the north by Seattle, to the east by Tukwila, to the south by Burien, and to the west by the White Center CDP. Washington State Route 99 cuts across the northeast part of the community, and State Route 509 forms the boundary between Boulevard Park and White Center.

Education
Portions of Boulevard Park are in the Highline School District while other parts are in Seattle Public Schools.

References 

Census-designated places in King County, Washington